Nicholas Callaway (b. ) is an app producer, book publisher, television producer, writer and photographer.

Callaway is the founder and CEO of Callaway Arts & Entertainment, a company that publishes illustrated books, mobile applications, computer-animated television series, and "branded lifestyle products". The company's book publishing division, Callaway Editions, specializes in the design, production and publication of high-quality illustrated books on the arts, design, fashion and photography. Titles include: Alfred Stieglitz: Photographs & Writings,  Georgia O'Keeffe ’s One Hundred Flowers, Irving Penn’s Passage, 'Madonna' ’s Sex, Diana: Portrait of A Princess, The Art of Make-Up by  Kevyn Aucoin, A Nation Challenged: A Visual History of 9/11 and its Aftermath, a series of children's books by Madonna beginning with The English Roses, the Callaway Classics series of  fairy tales, and OBAMA: The Historic Journey, co-published with The New York Times.

In 2012, he co-founded and was the CEO, then Chairman of Happy Studio, a company for the development of "lifestyle apps" for Apple's iOS devices, with headquarters on Union Square in New York City.

The company's first product, Martha Stewart CraftStudio, was released in partnership with Martha Stewart Living Omnimedia on June 21, 2012.

In August 2010, with an investment from Kleiner, Perkins, Caufield, and Byers, Callaway founded Callaway Digital Arts (CDA), which publishes children’s applications for Apple’s iPad, iPhone, and iPod family of products. All of CDA’s apps have risen to No. 1 in their category in the App Store, including Miss Spider’s Tea Party, Miss Spider’s Bedtime Story, Sesame Street’s The Monster at the End of This Book and Thomas & Friends: Misty Island Rescue, and the early learning literacy and numeracy series, Endless Alphabet.

In 1994, Callaway published  Miss Spider's Tea Party by David Kirk, which has sold 5 million copies worldwide. Subsequently, Nicholas Callaway and David Kirk founded Callaway & Kirk Company LLC, which is dedicated exclusively to the creations of David Kirk. Other products include: more than seventy Miss Spider titles; the CGI Nova the Robot book series; the Sunny Patch line of children's lifestyle products featured at Target stores for 7 years and subsequently acquired by the educational toy company Melissa & Doug; and Miss Spider's Sunny Patch Friends, a 3-D computer-animated television series that has aired on Nick Jr. in the US and in many other countries around the world since its debut in 2005.

Nicholas Callaway graduated from Harvard University in 1975 with degrees in Classics and Fine Arts; he studied with Robert Fitzgerald and Emily Vermeule. He undertook early fine art photography and design studies at MIT with the founder of Aperture, Minor White, with designer Muriel Cooper, and with portrait photographer Wendy Snyder McNeil.

From 1977 to 1979 Callaway was the first director of Galerie Zabriskie in Paris, where he curated and mounted many notable photography exhibitions, (many for the first time in Europe) including Harry Callahan, Lee Friedlander, Henri Cartier-Bresson, Eugène Atget, Berenice Abbott, Ansel Adams, William Klein, Man Ray and others. His final exhibition, French Avant Garde Photography Between the Wars, rediscovered for the first time photographers including Brassaï, Dora Maar, Claude Cahun, Eli Lotar, Germaine Krull, Roger Parry, Maurice Tabard, Jean Moral and Moï-Ver.

Callaway's photographs and writings have been published in Aperture (cover of Octave of Prayer, 1972 and Celebrations, 1975), Departures magazine and  Vanity Fair.

He is a member of the Callaway family that founded Callaway Plantation whose modern-day enterprises include Callaway Gardens, Callaway Golf Company and Callaway Cars.

References

External links 
 Official website
 Interview With Nicholas Callaway CNN Sunday Morning aired September 14, 2003
 Nicholas Callaway article from Graphis, March/April 2001
 Nicholas Callaway, book publisher article from Print, March–April 1998

Phillips Exeter Academy alumni
Harvard University alumni
American book publishers (people)
American television producers
Living people
Hampshire College alumni
Callaway family
1953 births